Avdotyino is a rural locality (a village) in Malyginskoye Rural Settlement, Kovrovsky District, Vladimir Oblast, Russia. The population was 62 as of 2010.

Geography 
Avdotyino is located 16 km north of Kovrov (the district's administrative centre) by road. Shirokovo is the nearest rural locality.

References 

Rural localities in Kovrovsky District